This article lists Internet television providers – broadcasters of Internet television using digital distribution – by region and by country. Internet TV is typically transmitted wirelessly, or through hard-wired devices, via an over-the-top programming platform to enabled SmartTVs, set-top-boxes, personal computers, smartphones, tablet computers, and digital media receivers.

Multiple continents

Africa

Republic of the Congo

Cote d'Ivoire

Ghana

Nigeria

South Africa

Asia

Afghanistan

Bangladesh

China

India

Bengali

All Languages

English

Tamil

Malayalam

Telugu

Indonesia

Iraq

Israel

Japan

Lebanon

Malaysia

Philippines

South Korea

Syria

United Arab Emirates

Vietnam

Caribbean

Barbados

Europe

Austria

Belgium

Bulgaria

Denmark

Croatia

Estonia

Finland

France

Germany

Hungary

Ireland

Italy

Lithuania

Netherlands

Norway

Poland

Portugal

Romania

Russia

Spain

Sweden

Switzerland

French only

German only

Turkey

United Kingdom

North America

Canada

Mexico

United States

English

Spanish

Hindi

Oceania

Australia

Fiji Islands

Hindi

New Zealand

South America

Argentina

Brazil

Colombia

Venezuela

References 

Streaming television
Internet broadcasting
Streaming
Video on demand